The Adventures of Robin Hood is a 1938 film starring Errol Flynn. The title may also refer to:

 The Adventures of Robin Hood (1985 film), a 1985 animated television film produced by Burbank Films Australia
 The Adventures of Robin Hood (TV series), a 1950s television series starring Richard Greene
 The Adventures of Robin Hood (video game), a 1991 video game published by Millennium Interactive

See also
 The Merry Adventures of Robin Hood, an 1883 novel by Howard Pyle
 The New Adventures of Robin Hood, a 1992 animated film produced by Burbank Animation Studios
 The New Adventures of Robin Hood, a 1997-98 television series
 The Zany Adventures of Robin Hood, a 1984 parody film starring George Segal